Puzha.com is the first Malayalam online magazine, founded in 2000, by Thomas Theakanath, Jeo Kurian, Harish Pillai, Shaji Thomas and KS James, that features original short-fiction,, poetry, reviews, interviews and columns and it has since become the leading outlet for emerging writers in Malayalam language. Puzha.com is also credited with making little magazines across Kerala available to a wider audience and archiving of local (traditional and to some extent tribal) knowledge base and folklore of Kerala. In 2007, Puzha.com received the prestigious Manthan Award for its dedication to the advancement of Malayalam literature, development of language tools and archiving and preservation of local knowledge base and folklore of Kerala.

Overview 
Since its inception, Puzha.com provided a publishing platform for emerging Malayalam writers. The original works of short-fiction, novels, poetry, reviews and other articles were sourced and edited at the Aluva office and published on a daily basis. However, a lot of leading Malayalam writers also regularly contribute the Magazine.

Notable contributors 
 M. T. Vasudevan Nair
 Sethu
 Chemmanam Chacko
 Kureepuzha Sreekumar
 K. L. Mohana Varma
 U. K. Kumaran
 D. Vinayachandran
 M. N. Vijayan
 Anand
 A. Ayyappan
 Akbar Kakkattil
 Madhusoodhanan Nair

Awards and citations 
Puzha.com was awarded the prestigious Manthan South Asia prize. Citation

References

External links 

Malayalam-language magazines
Magazines established in 2000
Indian literature websites
Online literary magazines